Jaisingrao is a given name. Notable people with the name include:

Jaisingrao Gaikwad Patil (born 1949), Indian politician
Jaisingrao Rane, Indian politician

Indian given names